Late Night Tales: Air is the 15th DJ mix album released in the Late Night Tales series on Late Night Tales. It was mixed by Jean-Benoît Dunckel from French band Air and was originally intended as the 14th release (scheduled for 3 October 2005) but was delayed several times. In the meantime, Late Night Tales: Belle & Sebastian was released. The Air compilation was eventually released on 11 September 2006.

Track listing
"All Cats are Grey" – The Cure
"Planet Caravan" – Black Sabbath
"O' Venezia Venaga Venusia" – Nino Rota
"I Shall Be Released" – The Band
"Camille" –  Georges Delerue
"Ghosts" – Japan
"The Old Man's Back Again" – Scott Walker
"Come Wander With Me" – Jeff Alexander
"Metal Heart" – Cat Power
"Lovin' You" – Minnie Riperton
"For the World" – Tan Dun
"Le long de la rivière tendre" – Sébastien Tellier (English: Along the loving river, from the soundtrack of "Narco")
"My Autumn's Done Come" – Lee Hazlewood
"P.L.A." – Robert Wyatt
"Let's Get Lost" – Elliott Smith
"Cousin Jane" – The Troggs (from "Trogglodynamite")
"Musica" – Air/Alessandro Baricco
"Pavane pour une infante défunte" – composed by Maurice Ravel, performed by The Cleveland Symphony Orchestra (English: Pavane for a dead princess)

References

Air
2006 compilation albums